Exorcism at 60,000 Feet is a 2019 comedy horror film that was directed by Chad Ferrin, based on a script written by Robert Rhine and Daniel Benton. Rhine also served as one of the film's producers and as one of the actors.

Synopsis
The movie begins with a Christian priest, Father Romero, exorcising a demon from two men, Lt. Garvan and Martin, by shooting Garvan in the head and killing him. Romero then boards a flight to Vietnam along with several other passengers. Garvan's remains are also on the plane. During the flight his body reanimates, allowing the demon to possess two of the passengers. Romero manages to successfully exorcise the passengers.

Romero tells a Rabbi, named Feldman, that he had served with Garvan during the Vietnam War. The lieutenant had put him in a coma for several years, due to Garvan having a mental breakdown and shooting both Romero and a little girl he was trying to exorcise. The demon possesses several others, one of which results in a possessed pregnant woman giving birth to a demon baby that gets flushed down the toilet. Together, the priest and rabbi go to the cargo hold to battle Garvan, who manages to escape by overwhelming Romero with visions.

During the chaos, Romero discovers that one of the passengers, Amanda, is the sister to the little girl Garvan murdered. He successfully persuades her to assist him and together they convince one of the pilots to fly the plane to 60,000 feet (18,288 meters), as this will take them further from Hell and the source of the demon's powers. More deaths and possessions occur, but ultimately Romero, Feldman, Amanda and several other survivors land the plane, only to be met by Garvan's corpse and several other undead, possessed people.

Cast 

 Robert Miano as Father Romero
 Bai Ling as Amanda
 Lance Henriksen as Captain Houdee
 Matthew Moy as Thang
 Kevin J. O'Connor as Buzz
 Bill Moseley as Garvan
 Adrienne Barbeau as Mrs. Montegue
 Robert Rhine as Rabbi Larry Feldman
 Silvia Spross as Sally
 Kelli Maroney as Ms. Jenkins
 Kyle Jones as Brad
 Johnny Williams as Frankie Foldem
 Jin N. Tonic as Veronica
 Stefanie Peti as Debbie
 Gino Salvano as Abudabu

Release
Exorcism at 60,000 Feet premiered on August 9, 2019 at Hollywood Horrorfest, followed by a Blu-ray, DVD, and VOD release on May 5 of the same year through Shout! Factory Films.

Reception
Much of the criticism for Exorcism at 60,000 Feet centered upon the film's humor, which Dread Central described as "tired gags and stereotypes". Elements of praise focused on the Richard Band soundtrack and Kim Newman stated that it was "almost superfluously excellent". HorrorNews.net gave a favorable review for the film, stating that it was "that film that cheerfully plays with its audience. A bucket of blood here, some pea green puke, nuns who engage in lesbian sex, as well as ample amounts of other outrageous humor, and a game cast of artists who are in all-too-familiar surroundings and loving it."

Awards 

 Best Horror Comedy Feature at Hollywood Horrorfest (2019, won - Robert Rhine)
 Best Actor at Hollywood Horrorfest (2019, won - Robert Miano)
 Best Comedy Actress at Hollywood Horrorfest (2019, won - Bai Ling)
 Best Original Score at Hollywood Horrorfest (2019, won - Richard Band)

References

External links
 

2019 comedy horror films
American parody films
Films scored by Richard Band
American zombie films
Demons in film
Films set on airplanes
Films about exorcism
2010s English-language films
2010s American films